Trafalgar is a 1971 album by the Bee Gees. It was their ninth album (seventh internationally), and was released in September 1971 in the US, and November 1971 in the UK. The album was a moderate hit in the United States, and peaked at No. 34. The lead single "How Can You Mend a Broken Heart?" was the first Bee Gees' No. 1 single in the United States but failed to chart in Britain as did the album. It is Geoff Bridgford's only full-length appearance on a Bee Gees album as an official member.

Trafalgar is included in Robert Dimery's book 1001 Albums You Must Hear Before You Die.

Recording
In December 1970, barely more than two months after the group recorded their last session for the 2 Years On album, they recorded "Together", "Over the Hill and Over the Mountain", "Merrily Merry Eyes" and "When Do I". They returned to the studio with new backing band member, guitarist Alan Kendall, who would play on the majority of their subsequent albums. Several songs were recorded around this time which have not officially been released. All of the songs chosen for release were ballads. Recording began on 28 January 1971 with "We Lost the Road", "When Do I" and "How Can You Mend a Broken Heart" ("We Lost the Road" was held over for use on the following album To Whom It May Concern). Recording continued through April with several demos and out-takes recorded but not released.

Release

With "How Can You Mend a Broken Heart" as the lead single from the album, "Don't Wanna Live Inside Myself" was released as the second single but only reached No. 57 on the US charts. "Israel" was released as a single in the Netherlands and reached No. 22. The album's cover depicts the battle of Trafalgar. Bridgford was credited on the sleeve notes on the original vinyl release as "Jeoff Bridgford".

In support of the album, The Bee Gees toured the US in the fall of 1971, playing such cities as Boston, Asbury Park, New York City (7 shows), Memphis, Kansas City, and Indianapolis.

Track listing

Alternate version
 This 53-minute version of the album was sent to Atlantic Records in the United States with a different track order and with 14 songs in total. The two extra songs are "Country Woman" (the B-side of "How Can You Mend a Broken Heart") and "We Lost the Road" (released on the group's next album To Whom It May Concern). There was no commercial release of the album in the US.
Side one
"How Can You Mend a Broken Heart"
"Israel"
"The Greatest Man in the World"
"It's Just the Way"
"Don't Wanna Live Inside Myself"
"Country Woman"
"Somebody Stop the Music"
Side two
"Trafalgar"
"We Lost the Road"
"Dearest"
"When Do I"
"Lion in Winter"
"Remembering"
"Walking Back to Waterloo"

Personnel
Barry Gibb – lead, harmony and backing vocals, rhythm guitar
Robin Gibb – lead, harmony and backing vocals
Maurice Gibb – harmony and backing vocals, bass, rhythm guitar, piano, Mellotron, Hammond organ, lead vocals on #4 (side 1) and #1 (side 2), drums on #1 (side 2)
 Geoff Bridgford – drums
Alan Kendall – lead guitar
 Bryan Scott – audio engineer
 Bill Shepherd – orchestral arrangement

Charts

References

1971 albums
Bee Gees albums
Polydor Records albums
Atco Records albums
Albums produced by Barry Gibb
Albums produced by Robin Gibb
Albums produced by Maurice Gibb
Albums produced by Robert Stigwood
Albums recorded at IBC Studios
Soft rock albums by English artists
Concept albums